Lionel Fernando (born 21 October 1939) is a former cricketer who played for Ceylon from 1964 to 1971.

Life and career
Lionel Fernando received his early education at St Anne's College in Kurunegala, where his father was the Municipal Commissioner. Later he attended St. Benedict's College, Colombo, where he captained the cricket team in 1959. In a match against the team from St Anne's College, he dismissed the opposition for 50, taking all 10 wickets for 24, including a hat-trick, then scored a double-century in 157 minutes, all in one day's play. The feat of taking all 10 wickets and scoring a double-century in the same match is believed to be unique in world cricket.

His bowling fell away, but he represented Ceylon in the 1960s as a batsman and slip fielder. He made his first-class debut for a Ceylon Board President's XI when they defeated a Pakistan team in 1964–65. In 1965-66 he top-scored with 40 in a one-day match for Ceylon against the touring MCC. In 1966-67 he toured Pakistan with the Ceylon team, playing in one of the unofficial Tests, and a few weeks later, against the touring West Indians, scored 48 and 72 not out.

In the 1970s he played league cricket in England: two seasons with Fieldhouse in the South Lancashire League and one season for Walsden in the Central Lancashire League.

He migrated to Australia in 1984 and played several seasons of club cricket for Jacana in Melbourne. He and his wife Stella live in Melbourne. They have two sons, Tyrone and Dilshan, and a daughter, Marina. In September 2018, he was one of 49 former Sri Lankan cricketers felicitated by Sri Lanka Cricket, to honour them for their services before Sri Lanka became a full member of the International Cricket Council (ICC).

References

External links

1939 births
Living people
People from Negombo
All-Ceylon cricketers
Saracens Sports Club cricketers
Alumni of St. Benedict's College, Colombo
Australian people of Sri Lankan descent